Love and Lies or Love & Lies may refer to:

 Love & Lies, a 2013 Philippine TV series
 Love and Lies (manga), a Japanese manga and anime series
 Love and Lies (2017 film), a Japanese film based on the manga series
 Love, Lies (2016 film), a South Korean film
 Love and Lies (1981 film), an American localization name for the Soviet film  (You couldn't even dreamed that)
 Love and Lies (1990 film), a television movie featuring Robert Harper
 "Love and Lies", a 2011 episode of American television show Private Practice
 Love and Lies, the second studio album by Anthony Ramos

See also
 Love Lies (disambiguation)